Oronomis is a genus of moths of the family Crambidae. It contains only one species, Oronomis xanthothysana, which is found in India (Sikkim).

References

Natural History Museum Lepidoptera genus database

Pyraustinae
Monotypic moth genera
Moths of Asia
Crambidae genera
Taxa named by Eugene G. Munroe